The Ese Ejja are an indigenous people of Bolivia and Peru, in the southwestern Amazon basin. 1,687 Ese Ejja live in Bolivia, in the Pando and Beni Departments, in the foothills along the Beni and the Madre de Dios Rivers. In Peru, they live along the Tambopata and Heath Rivers, near Puerto Maldonado.

Name
Their name derives from their autonym, Ece'je, which means "people." They are also known as the Chama, Ese Eja, Ese Exa, Ese’ejja, Huarayo, Tambopata-Guarayo, or Tiatinagua people.

Language
The Ese Ejja language is a Tacanan language, spoken by all ages, and written in the Latin script. A dictionary has been produced for the language.

Subsistence
Ese Ejja people are traditionally hunter-gatherers, farmers, rangers, and fishermen.

Notes

External links
Ese Ejja artwork , National Museum of the American Indian

Indigenous peoples in Bolivia
Indigenous peoples in Peru
Indigenous peoples of the Amazon
Hunter-gatherers of South America